Four is the fourth studio album released by the hard rock band Fair Warning.

Track listing
All songs written by Ule W. Ritgen except where noted.
 "Heart On the Run" – 5:44 (Helge Engelke)
 "Through the Fire" – 3:57
 "Break Free" – 5:03
 "Forever" – 5:22 (Engelke)
 "Tell Me I'm Wrong" – 4:18
 "Dream" – 4:58
 "I Fight" – 3:58
 "Time Will Tell" – 4:16
 "Eyes of Love" – 3:55
 "Find My Way" – 3:44 (Engelke)
 "Night Falls" – 4:39
 "Wait" – 4:04
 "For the Young" – 4:14 (Engelke)

Japanese Edition

13. "Still I Believe" – 4:50 (Engelke) Japanese bonus track

14. "For the Young" – 4:14 (Engelke)

Personnel
Tommy Heart – vocals
Helge Engelke – guitars
Andy Malecek – guitars
Ule W. Ritgen – bass guitar
Philippe Candas – drums (Tracks 1-6 & 8-13)
C. C. Behrens – drums (Track 7)

References

External links
Heavy Harmonies page

Fair Warning (band) albums
2000 albums

it:Four (disambigua)#Musica